Sounds Like Music is a British game show that aired on ITV from 6 June 1989 to 11 May 1990 and hosted by Bobby Crush.

Transmissions

External links

1980s British music television series
1990s British music television series
1980s British game shows
1990s British game shows
1989 British television series debuts
1990 British television series endings
English-language television shows
ITV game shows
Musical game shows
Television shows produced by Television South West (TSW)